The Rithet Building is an historic building in Victoria, British Columbia, Canada.  It is a three-storey brick commercial building on the east side of Wharf Street, facing Victoria's Inner Harbour.

See also
 List of historic places in Victoria, British Columbia

References

External links
 

Commercial buildings completed in 1865
Buildings and structures in Victoria, British Columbia